Surawich Logarwit (born 11 February 1993) is a Thai professional footballer who plays for Chiangmai United in Thai League 2 as a  defender.

References

External links
 Goal.com 
 Players Profile - info.thscore.com
 

1993 births
Living people
Surawich Logarwit
Surawich Logarwit
Surawich Logarwit
Association football defenders
Surawich Logarwit
Surawich Logarwit
Surawich Logarwit
Surawich Logarwit
Surawich Logarwit